In physics, a Bragg plane is a plane in reciprocal space which bisects a reciprocal lattice vector, at right angles. The Bragg plane is defined as part of the Von Laue condition for diffraction peaks in x-ray diffraction crystallography.

Considering the adjacent diagram, the arriving x-ray plane wave is defined by:

Where  is the incident wave vector given by:

where  is the wavelength of the incident photon. While the Bragg formulation assumes a unique choice of direct lattice planes and specular reflection of the incident X-rays, the Von Laue formula only assumes monochromatic light and that each scattering center acts as a source of secondary wavelets as described by the Huygens principle. Each scattered wave contributes to a new plane wave given by:

The condition for constructive interference in the  direction is that the path difference between the photons is an integer multiple (m) of their wavelength. We know then that for constructive interference we have:

where . Multiplying the above by  we formulate the condition in terms of the wave vectors,  and :

Now consider that a crystal is an array of scattering centres, each at a point in the Bravais lattice. We can set one of the scattering centres as the origin of an array.

An equivalent statement (see mathematical description of the reciprocal lattice) is to say that:

By comparing this equation with the definition of a reciprocal lattice vector, we see that constructive interference occurs if  is a vector of the reciprocal lattice. We notice that  and  have the same magnitude, we can restate the Von Laue formulation as requiring that the tip of incident wave vector, must lie in the plane that is a perpendicular bisector of the reciprocal lattice vector, . This reciprocal space plane is the Bragg plane.

See also
 X-ray crystallography
 Reciprocal lattice
 Bravais lattice
 Powder diffraction
 Kikuchi line
 Brillouin zone

References

Crystallography
Planes (geometry)
Fourier analysis
Lattice points
Diffraction